Rataban a Himalayan mountain peak situated in the Chamoli district of Uttarakhand, India.

References

Mountains of Uttarakhand
Geography of Chamoli district